The 2019 North Carolina Tar Heels baseball team represents the University of North Carolina at Chapel Hill in the 2019 NCAA Division I baseball season. Head coach Mike Fox is in his 21st year coaching the Tar Heels. They play their home games at Bryson Field at Boshamer Stadium and are members of the Atlantic Coast Conference.

Roster

2019 MLB draft

References

2019 in sports in North Carolina
2019 Atlantic Coast Conference baseball season
North Carolina Tar Heels baseball seasons
North Carolina
Atlantic Coast Conference baseball champion seasons